John Townsend (born 16 June 1943) is a former Australian rules footballer who played for Melbourne in the Victorian Football League (VFL).

Originally from Sale, Townsend came to Melbourne and made his league debut in 1962. 

He played as a rover and was handy near goals, topping the club's goalkicking in their premiership season of 1964 with 35 of them.

Townsend won Melbourne's Best and Fairest award in both 1965 and 1969. 

He finished his career in the Victorian Football Association with Prahran.

In 2003 he was selected in Prahran's Team of the Century.

Playing statistics

|- style="background-color: #EAEAEA"
! scope="row" style="text-align:center" | 1962
|style="text-align:center;"|
| 16 || 6 || 7 ||  ||  ||  ||  ||  ||  || 1.2 ||  ||  ||  ||  ||  || 
|-
! scope="row" style="text-align:center" | 1963
|style="text-align:center;"|
| 16 || 19 || 22 ||  ||  ||  ||  ||  ||  || 1.2 ||  ||  ||  ||  ||  || 
|- style="background:#eaeaea;"
! scope="row" style="text-align:center;" | 1964
|style="text-align:center;"|
| 16 || 20 || 35 ||  ||  ||  ||  ||  ||  || 1.8 ||  ||  ||  ||  ||  || 
|-
! scope="row" style="text-align:center" | 1965
|style="text-align:center;"|
| 16 || 18 || 34 || 26 || 295 || 42 || 337 || 63 ||  || 1.9 || 1.4 || 16.4 || 2.3 || 18.7 || 3.5 || 
|- style="background:#eaeaea;"
! scope="row" style="text-align:center" | 1966
|style="text-align:center;"|
| 16 || 1 || 0 || 1 || 11 || 2 || 13 || 1 ||  || 0.0 || 1.0 || 11.0 || 2.0 || 13.0 || 1.0 || 
|-
! scope="row" style="text-align:center" | 1967
|style="text-align:center;"|
| 16 || 6 || 5 || 7 || 75 || 31 || 106 || 16 ||  || 0.8 || 1.2 || 12.5 || 5.2 || 17.7 || 2.7 || 
|- style="background:#eaeaea;"
! scope="row" style="text-align:center" | 1968
|style="text-align:center;"|
| 16 || 16 || 15 || 11 || 254 || 62 || 316 || 53 ||  || 0.9 || 0.7 || 15.9 || 3.9 || 19.8 || 3.3 || 
|-
! scope="row" style="text-align:center" | 1969
|style="text-align:center;"|
| 16 || 20 || 16 || 29 || 416 || 68 || 484 || 97 ||  || 0.8 || 1.5 || 20.8 || 3.4 || 24.2 || 4.9 || 
|- style="background:#eaeaea;"
! scope="row" style="text-align:center" | 1970
|style="text-align:center;"|
| 16 || 17 || 14 || 20 || 265 || 48 || 313 || 63 ||  || 0.8 || 1.2 || 15.6 || 2.8 || 18.4 || 3.7 || 
|-
! scope="row" style="text-align:center" | 1971
|style="text-align:center;"|
| 16 || 18 || 25 || 28 || 301 || 87 || 388 || 80 ||  || 1.4 || 1.6 || 16.7 || 4.8 || 21.6 || 4.4 || 
|- style="background:#eaeaea;"
! scope="row" style="text-align:center" | 1972
|style="text-align:center;"|
| 16 || 12 || 9 || 12 || 152 || 44 || 196 || 48 ||  || 0.8 || 1.0 || 12.7 || 3.7 || 16.3 || 4.0 || 
|- class="sortbottom"
! colspan=3| Career
! 153
! 182
! 134
! 1769
! 384
! 2153
! 421
! 
! 1.2
! 1.2
! 16.4
! 3.6
! 19.9
! 3.9
! 
|}

References

External links

1943 births
Australian rules footballers from Victoria (Australia)
Melbourne Football Club players
Prahran Football Club players
Keith 'Bluey' Truscott Trophy winners
Living people
People from Sale, Victoria
Melbourne Football Club Premiership players
One-time VFL/AFL Premiership players